William Clayton Drescher (May 23, 1921 – May 15, 1968) was an American professional baseball catcher who appeared in 57 games in Major League Baseball for the New York Yankees between in  and .

Nicknamed "Dutch", Drescher had a 12-year professional career that began in 1942 and ended in 1954; he did not play during the 1951 season. Most of his MLB action occurred during , the last wartime season, when Drescher caught 266 innings, second only to Mike Garbark among backstops on the Yankee roster. In 1946, with war veterans returning to baseball, Drescher got into only six May games and caught 12 innings before returning to the minor leagues. He played at Triple-A for the rest of his pro career.

With the Yankees, Drescher had 37 career hits, including four doubles, one triple and 16 RBIs, batting .266 in 57 games. He died at age 46 on May 15, 1968, in Haverstraw, New York.

External links
baseball reference

1921 births
1968 deaths
Amsterdam Rugmakers players
Baseball players from New York (state)
Binghamton Triplets players
Kansas City Blues (baseball) players
Major League Baseball catchers
Newark Bears (IL) players
New York Yankees players
People from Congers, New York
People from Haverstraw, New York
Syracuse Chiefs players